The following are the national records in athletics in Mongolia maintained by the Mongolian Athletic Federation (MAF).

Outdoor

Key to tables: 

h = hand timing

NWI = no wind information

Men

Women

Indoor

Men

Women

References
General
World Athletics Statistic Handbook 2022: National Outdoor Records
World Athletics Statistic Handbook 2022: National Indoor Records
Specific

External links

Mongolia
Records
Athletics
athletics